Süleymanoğlu is a Turkish surname. It is formed by adding the Turkish patronymic suffix -oğlu with the meaning "son of" to the Muslim masculine given name Sulayman, equivalent to Solomon. Notable people with the surname include:

 Hafız Süleymanoğlu (born 1967), Turkish weightlifter of Azerbaijani origin
 Naim Süleymanoğlu (1967–2017), Turkish world and Olympic champion weightlifter of Bulgarian origin
 Nurhan Süleymanoğlu (born 1971), Turkish boxer of Kazakh origin

Turkish-language surnames
Patronymic surnames
Surnames from given names